Antonio Margil, OFM (18 August 1657 – 6 August 1726) was a Spanish Franciscan missionary in North and Central America.

Life
Margil entered the Franciscan Order in his Native city of Valencia, Spain on 22 April 1673. After his ordination to the priesthood, he volunteered for the Native American missions and arrived at Vera Cruz on 6 June 1683. He was stationed at the missionary college of Santa Cruz, Querétaro, but was generally engaged in reaching missions in Yucatan, Costa Rica, Nicaragua, and especially in Guatemala.

He always walked barefooted, without sandals, fasted every day in the year, never used meat or fish, and applied the discipline and other instruments of penance to himself unmercifully. He slept very little but passed in prayer the greater part of the night, as well as the time allotted for the siesta.

On 25 June 1706, Margil was appointed the first guardian of the newly erected missionary college of Guadalupe, Zacatecas. In 1716 he led a band of three fathers and two lay-brothers into Texas, and founded the missions of Guadalupe among the Nacogdoches, Dolores among the Ays, and San Miguel among the Adays. These sites are in modern-day East Texas and northern Louisiana.  On a 1716 letter to the viceroy of New Spain, Margil was the first to refer to these territories as the province of New Philippines.

When the French destroyed these missions, Father Margil withdrew to the Rio San Antonio (San Antonio River). He remained near the present city of San Antonio, Texas for more than a year. There he established Mission San José (Texas) to serve the Coahuiltecan Indians.

He then returned with his priests to the scene of his former activity, restored the missions, and gave his attention to the French settlers in Louisiana. In 1722 he was elected guardian of his college; at the close of his office term, he resumed missionary work in Mexico. He died in Mexico City in the Convento Grande de San Francisco.

See also
 Spanish missions in Texas

References

Attribution
 The entry cites:
ESPINOSA, Crónica Apóstolica y Seràfica (Mexico, 1746);
VILAPLANA, Vida del V.P. Fr. Antonio Margil (Madrid, 1775); 
ARRICIVITA, Crónica Seràfica y Apóstolica (Mexico, 1792);
SOTO-MAYOR, Historia del Apóstolico Colegio de Guadalupe (Zacatecas, 1874); 
SHEA, Catholic Church in Colonial Days (New York, 1886).

1657 births
1726 deaths
Spanish Franciscans
Spanish Roman Catholic missionaries
Roman Catholic missionaries in Guatemala
17th-century Spanish people
18th-century Spanish people
Franciscan missionaries
Roman Catholic missionaries in New Spain
Spanish explorers of North America